Crazy Stone may refer to:

Crazy Stone (film), 2006 Chinese film
Crazy Stone (software), Go playing engine